Guntram Wolf (25 March 1935, Kronach – 4 February 2013, Kronach) was a maker of modern and historical woodwind instruments in Kronach, Germany.

His productions
He specialized in the modern Heckel (German) system bassoon and was one of the better known makers of Wiener (Viennese) oboes. He also made a considerable number of historical instrument replicas of bassoons, oboes and clarinets, as well as child-sized models of the same instruments.

Innovations
Guntram Wolf also developed a redesign of the contrabassoon after an acoustical concept by Benedikt Eppelsheim, called the "Contraforte". The Contraforte was received well in many countries but has a very small following in the United States, with less than a half dozen players of the instrument.

More recently, he and Eppelsheim developed a redesigned bass oboe, called the "Lupophone".

References
 idrs.org

External links
 Official website

German musical instrument makers
2013 deaths
1935 births